The Apostolic Church Nigeria is a Pentecostal Christian denomination in Nigeria with its national headquarters at Olorunda Ketu, Lagos and international headquarters in Penygroes, UK.

History
The church has its origins in the founding of a prayer group called "Precious Stone" in Ijebu Ode by the Anglican leader Joseph Shadare in 1918. In 1922, the church left the Anglican Church. The church joined the Apostolic Church in 1931. In 1938, the denomination counted 120 churches in Nigeria.

In 2011, the denomination inaugurated a 10,000-seat temple called National Temple in Lagos.

In 2018, the church had 4.5 million members in Nigeria.

Doctrine and belief
The Apostolic Church Nigeria is built on a fundamental doctrinal belief based on the Holy Scriptures. Its theological beliefs are summarised in its confession of faith, known as the Tenets, which read as follows:
 The Unity of the God-head and the Trinity of the persons there-in. Genesis 1:1; Matt 3:16-17; 1 John 5:7
 The utter depravity of human nature, the necessity for repentance and regeneration and the eternal doom of the finally impenitent (i.e. unrepentant). Gen 3:1-19; Isaiah 53:6; Acts 2:38; 17:30, John 5:28-29; Daniel 12:2; Romans 2:7, 6:23; 1 John 1:1-2
 The Virgin Birth, Sinless Life, Atoning Death, Triumphant Resurrection, Ascension and Abiding intercession of Our Lord Jesus Christ. His second coming and millennial reign upon earth. John 8:46; 14:30; Col. 1:15; 2 Corinthians 5:19; Romans 3:25; Acts 2:36; Phil. 2:9-11; 1 Thessalonians 4:16-17; Rev. 22:20
 Justification and sanctification of the believer through the finished work of Christ. Acts 2:38; Luke 15:7; Romans 4:25; 5:16; 1 Corinthians 1:30; 1 Thessalonians 4:30
 The baptism of the Holy Ghost for believers with signs following. 1 Corinthians 12:8-11; Mark 16:17; Acts 2:4; and Galatians 5:22
 The nine gifts of the Holy Ghost for the edification, exhortation and comfort of the Church, which is the body of Christ. 1 Corinthians 12:4-11
 The sacraments of baptism by immersion and of the Lord's Supper. Rom 6:4, 6:11, 6:13-14, Luke 3:21; Mark 16:16, Luke 2:22-24, 34; Mark 10:16, Luke 22:19-20; Matt. 26:21-29; Acts 20:7
 The divine inspiration and authority of the Holy Scriptures. 2 Tim 3:16, 2 Peter 1:21
 Church government by Apostles, Prophets, Evangelists, Pastors, Teachers, Elders and Deacons. Ephesians 4:11-13, 1 Corinthians 12:28
 The possibility of falling from Grace. 1 Corinthians 10:12, 1 John 5:11, John 15:4, 1 John 5:12, Romans 5:1-2, John 8:51, 1 Timothy 4:1, 16; 2 Timothy 3:13-15, 1 Corinthians 15:1, Colossians 1:21-23
 The obligatory nature of Tithes and Offerings. Malachi 3:10, Matthew 23:23, Hebrews 7:1-4; Luke 6:38; Acts 20:35
 Divine Healing through obedience to the command of our Lord Jesus Christ and faith in his name and merit of his blood for all sickness, disease and infirmities.

Organization and administration
The Apostolic Church Nigeria is administered as a single entity by the National Council and it is headed by a President. The current president is Apostle E.S Igwe, who was the chairman of Igboland territory. Igwe succeeded Pastor G.O. Olutola in February 2017. Pastor G.O Olutola, who himself succeeded Pastor Eyo Okon in 2011, retired at the age of 80 and handed over the mantle of leadership to Apostle E.S Igwe.

Glorious Vision University formerly Samuel Adegboyega University
In 2011, the church founded Samuel Adegboyega University, a tertiary institution located in Ogwa, Edo State, Nigeria and named after LAWNA's first territorial chairman Samuel Adegboyega.

National Convention
The National Convention is a biannual gathering of all The Apostolic Church members at the National Temple, Alapere, Ketu, Lagos State, Nigeria.

References

External links
Official Website

Churches in Nigeria
Pentecostal denominations established in the 20th century
Religious organizations established in the 1930s
Pentecostal denominations in Africa
1931 establishments in Nigeria